Oleksandr Smokvin (born 15 August 1979) is a Ukrainian former competitive figure skater. He won bronze medals at the 1997 European Youth Olympic Festival, 1998 ISU Junior Grand Prix in Ukraine, and 2001 Crystal Skate of Romania. In 1999, he was named in Ukraine's team to the World Junior Championships in Zagreb; he qualified for the free skate and finished 24th overall.

In 2007, Smokvin skated with Anette Bøe in Isdans, Norway's version of Dancing on Ice. He previously worked as a coach at Oslo Skøiteklub in Oslo, where one of his students were Juni Marie Benjaminsen. He currently works as a coach at Luleå figure skating club in Sweden.

Competitive highlights 
JGP: Junior Series/Junior Grand Prix

References 

1979 births
Ukrainian male single skaters
Living people
Ukrainian emigrants to Norway
Competitors at the 2001 Winter Universiade